First Baptist Church (First Missionary Baptist Church) is a historic Baptist church at 707 South Street in Greenville, Alabama.  It was founded and built in 1908 by Rev. Stuart Adams and added to the National Register of Historic Places in 1986.

References

Baptist churches in Alabama
Churches on the National Register of Historic Places in Alabama
Churches completed in 1908
Churches in Butler County, Alabama
Greenville, Alabama
National Register of Historic Places in Butler County, Alabama
1908 establishments in Alabama